The 2009 season is Universitario de Deportes' 81st season in the Peruvian Primera División and 44th in the Campeonato Descentralizado. This article shows player statistics and all matches (official and friendly) that the club played during the 2009 season. The season's biggest highlight was the signing of Nolberto Solano.

Players
Summer and winter transfers correspond to Southern Hemisphere seasons.

Squad information

Players in/out

In

Out

Goalscorers

Competitions

Overall

Torneo Descentralizado

First stage

Standings

Summary

Results by round

Second stage

Standings

Summary

Results by round

Third stage

Copa Libertadores

Group 8

Matches

Competitive

Copa Libertadores

Torneo Descentralizado

First stage

Second stage

Finals

Friendly

External links
Universitario.pe Official website

2009
Universitario De Deportes